April Rapier (born 1953) is an American photographer. Rapier was born in Houston.

Her work is included in the collection of the Museum of Fine Arts Houston, the Rhode Island School of Design Museum and the Harry Ransom Center.

References

Living people
1978 births
21st-century American photographers
21st-century American women artists
Photographers from Texas